Harry J. Beresford (4 November 1863 – 4 October 1944) was an English-born actor on the American stage and in motion pictures. He used the professional name Harry J. Morgan early in his career.

Career
Harry Beresford began his acting career in 1885, as a member of the chorus of Little Jack Sheppard at the Gaiety Theatre, London. After moving to the United States in 1886, he performed throughout the country in repertory theatre and with various touring companies—including his own—for the next 30 years. His first major Broadway theatre success was in 1919, in Boys Will Be Boys, which was soon followed by a starring role in Shavings (1920). In August 1922, he created the role of the alcoholic Clem Hawley in Don Marquis's comedy The Old Soak, a character Beresford made famous and played for two years. He won praise for his character performances in the Broadway productions of Stolen Fruit (1925) and The Perfect Alibi (1928).

Between 1926 and 1938, Beresford appeared as a supporting actor in more than 50 Hollywood films, including Doctor X (1932), The Sign of the Cross (1932),  Dinner at Eight (1933), I Cover the Waterfront (1933), David Copperfield (1935) and Follow the Fleet (1936). He made his final film appearance in 1938, and received original story credit for the 1939 horse racing film, Long Shot.

Personal life
Beresford was born in London 4 November 1863, to Henry George and Sarah Christie. His professional name was Harry J. Morgan at the time of his first marriage, to actress Emma Dunn, on 4 October 1897, in Chicago. They divorced on 10 February 1909, in New York City, and Dunn was awarded sole custody of their young daughter, Dorothy. Beresford married actress Edith D. Wylie, who had appeared opposite him in the play, The Other House. They were married for the remainder of his life.

Dunn, who likewise worked in Hollywood pictures in her later years, recalled testing for the role of a bullied wife in a 1935 film. When the casting director said she was too small for the part, she asked to be seen beside the actor who would play her husband—and discovered it was Harry Beresford. In 1936, columnist Jimmie Fidler reported that Beresford, then aged 72, had collapsed while working on an RKO Pictures soundstage. Unconscious for two hours, he was cared for by Dunn, who happened to be working on a set nearby.

Beresford died 4 October 1944, at his home in Toluca Lake, Los Angeles, of a heart ailment. He was interred at Forest Lawn Memorial Park.

Theatre credits

Filmography

References

External links

1863 births
1944 deaths
Male actors from London
English male actors
20th-century English male actors
Burials at Forest Lawn Memorial Park (Glendale)
British expatriate male actors in the United States